In the mathematical theory of metric spaces, a metric map is a function between metric spaces that does not increase any distance (such functions are always  continuous).
These maps are the morphisms in the category of metric spaces, Met (Isbell 1964).
They are also called Lipschitz functions with Lipschitz constant 1, nonexpansive maps, nonexpanding maps, weak contractions, or short maps.

Specifically, suppose that X and Y are metric spaces and ƒ is a function from X to Y. Thus we have a metric map when, for any points x and y in X,
 
Here dX and dY denote the metrics on X and Y respectively.

Examples 

Let us consider the metric space  with the Euclidean metric.

Category of metric maps
The composite of metric maps is also metric map, and the identity map  on a metric space  is a metric map. Thus metric spaces together with metric maps form a category Met. Met is a subcategory of the category of metric spaces and Lipschitz functions. A map  between metric spaces is an isometry if and only if it is a bijective metric map whose inverse is also a metric map. Thus the isomorphisms in Met are precisely the isometries.

Strictly metric maps
One can say that ƒ is strictly metric if the inequality is strict for every two different points. Thus a contraction mapping is strictly metric, but not necessarily the other way around. Note that an isometry is never strictly metric, except in the degenerate case of the empty space or a single-point space.

Multivalued version 
A mapping  from a metric space X to the family of nonempty subsets of X is said to be Lipschitz if there exists  such that

for all , where H is the Hausdorff distance. When , T is called nonexpansive and when , T is called a contraction.

See also

References

 

Theory of continuous functions
Lipschitz maps
Metric geometry